Pieris may refer to:

Organisms 
 Pieris (plant), the andromeda or fetterbush, a plant genus in the family Ericaceae
 Pieris (butterfly), the garden whites, a butterfly genus in the family Pieridae
 Pieris, a synonym of the genus Pierella in the butterfly family Nymphalidae

Places 
 Pieris, Italy, a hamlet of San Canzian d'Isonzo in Italy
 Pieria (regional unit), also Pieris, an administrative unit and a historic region in Greece
 Pieris, an ancient name of the Greek settlement Kondariotissa
 Pieres, an ancient Thracian tribe living in the Pieria region
 Piereis, a municipal unit in Kavala regional unit, Greece

People 
 Mevan Pieris (born 1946), Sri Lankan former cricket player
 Paules Edward Pieris Deraniyagala (1900–1976), a Sri Lankan paleontologist, zoologist and artist
 Aloysius Pieris (born 1934), Jesuit Priest and director of the Tulana Center in Sri Lanka

Other uses
 Pieris (mythology), a figure in Greek mythology

See also 
 Pieris Kurundu, a type 7 cinnamon of the Cinnamomum verum variety
 Peiris, a surname
 Pierian Spring, the metaphorical source of knowledge about art and science